The International Film Music Critics Association Award for Film Composer of the Year is an annual award given by the International Film Music Critics Association, or the IFMCA. The award is given to the composer of a film score or score deemed to be the best in a given year. The award was first given in 1998 and 1999, before going a five-year hiatus. It has been awards every year since 2004.

Winners and nominations

1990s

2000s

2010s

2020s

References

International Film Music Critics Association Awards